Jinfeng is a town under the administration of Changle District, Fuzhou, Fujian, China. , it has 2 residential communities and 19 villages under its administration.

References 

Township-level divisions of Fujian
Fuzhou